Latvia participated in the Junior Eurovision Song Contest 2010 which took place on 20 November 2010, in Minsk, Belarus. The Latvian broadcaster Latvijas Televīzija (LTV) selected the Latvian entry for the 2010 contest internally.

Before Junior Eurovision

Internal selection 
On 30 July 2010, LTV announced that they had selected the winner of Balss pavēlnieks, Šarlote Lēnmane, to represent Latvia at the Junior Eurovision Song Contest 2010. Her song "Viva la Dance (Dejo tā)" was presented on 8 October 2010.

At Junior Eurovision

Voting

Notes

References

Junior Eurovision Song Contest
Latvia
Junior